The seventh Women's U.S. Cup tournament held in 2001, were joined by four teams: China, Germany, Japan, and the U.S.
The tournament was abandoned after three matches were played due to the September 11 attacks.

Matches

Placing
Placing at the time the tournament was abandoned.

References

2001
2001 in women's association football
2001 in American women's soccer
2001–02 in German women's football
2001 in Chinese football
2001 in Japanese women's football
September 2001 sports events in the United States
Association football events curtailed due to the September 11 attacks